Anchoa lyolepis, the shortfinger anchovy, is a species of anchovy native to the western Atlantic Ocean from New York to Brazil.  This species can reach a length of  TL, though they usually do not exceed  TL.  This species is important to local subsistence fisheries and is commonly used as bait.

References
T. Modde and S. T. Ross, Seasonality of Fishes Occupying a Surf Zone Habitat in the Northern Gulf of Mexico, FISH BULL. (SEATTLE). Vol. 78, no. 4, pp. 911–922. 1980.

lyolepis
Taxa named by Barton Warren Evermann
Taxa named by Millard Caleb Marsh
Fish described in 1900